Tuscany-Canterbury is a historic neighborhood in northern Baltimore, Maryland, United States.
Its history, development, and flavor are outlined in Eileen Higham's book Tuscany-Canterbury: A Baltimore Neighborhood History.

It was listed on the National Register of Historic Places in 2001.

References

External links
, including photo from 2000, and boundary map at Maryland Historical Trust

 
Tudor Revival architecture in Maryland
Neighborhoods in Baltimore
Historic districts on the National Register of Historic Places in Baltimore